Tömörbaataryn Nyamdavaa (born 5 May 1960) is a Mongolian speed skater. He competed in four events at the 1980 Winter Olympics.

References

1960 births
Living people
Mongolian male speed skaters
Olympic speed skaters of Mongolia
Speed skaters at the 1980 Winter Olympics
Place of birth missing (living people)
20th-century Mongolian people